Allen-Stevenson is a private boys school for kindergarten through 8th grade in New York City, New York. It opened in 1883 and moved to its present location at 132 East 78th Street in 1924.

History 
 
The Allen School was founded in 1883 by Francis Bellows Allen at a home on Fifth Avenue and 57th Street. Its first class enrolled only three boys. In 1885, the school moved to rented rooms at Madison Avenue and 44th Street with an enrollment of 20 boys. In 1904, Mr. Allen met Robert Alston Stevenson, a tutor, who by chance had taken a room at 509 Fifth Avenue, where the School was then located. In 1904, Mr. Allen and Mr. Stevenson joined forces and then moved to 50 East 57th Street with 100 students. By 1918 enrollment exceeded 200. The School published its first newspaper, The Spotlight, and introduced an exercise program and team sports. 
 
In 1924, the School purchased two brownstones for a new schoolhouse and moved to its present location on the Upper East Side.  In 1939, Mr. Allen retired at the age of 80, after 56 years of service. In 1947, Mr. Stevenson retired after 43 years of service. His son, Robert "Huck" Alston Stevenson Jr., who had taught at the School, succeeded him as Headmaster. 
 	
In 1950, Joseph C. Rennard became Headmaster of Allen-Stevenson and served for nine years. The School introduced team sports at Randall's Island and required boys to wear navy blue blazers and gray flannel pants. In 1959, Henry Dyer Tiffany Jr. became Headmaster until 1974. Under his leadership, a modern science lab and a paneled library, a gift from the Bell family, were added.

Allen-Stevenson's school song was composed by Rolande Maxwell Young in 1968, the year she joined the A-S faculty as a lower-school music teacher.

In 1974, Desmond Cole became Headmaster and served in that capacity for 16 years. During his tenure, he created the Middle School division.
 
In 1983, The Allen-Stevenson School celebrated its first 100 years and published The Allen-Stevenson Centennial Album. Around that time an East 77th Street addition, designed by A-S parent Alfredo De Vido, was built onto the school.
 
In 1990, the Board of Trustees appointed David Trower as Allen-Stevenson's seventh Headmaster. In 2001, Allen-Stevenson launched its first website to improve communication about the School.
 	
In 2007, a total renovation-expansion of the school interior was completed, which preserved the school's Classical Revival brick and Victorian brownstone facades according to New York Landmarks Preservation Commission guidelines for the Upper East Side Historic District.
 	
In 2008, the school completed a year-long celebration of its 125th anniversary. The Board of Trustees approved Allen-Stevenson and Its Community, a policy statement about inclusion and community life.
 	
In 2009, Allen-Stevenson was twice recognized for its work on energy and the environment, first with a coveted Energy Star rating by the U.S. Department of Energy, and then by the U.S. Green Building Council (USGBC) for LEED Gold Certification for Existing Buildings (EB). This made Allen-Stevenson the very first elementary school in the United States to achieve LEED-EB Gold status.

In 2015, Allen-Stevenson filed an application to New York City's Board of Standards and Appeals to build two new buildings behind the facades of existing brownstones for expansion of classroom, arts and athletics space, and cap them with an 18-foot rooftop greenhouse.

As of 2019, Allen-Stevenson is part way through renovating the adjacent townhouse

Academics 
Allen-Stevenson's program is built on the three A's – Academics, Athletics & the Arts.
Spanish is taught in all grades.

Athletics 

Fall   - Soccer, Flag Football, Cross Country, and Intramurals

Winter - Basketball, Wrestling, and Intramurals

Spring - Baseball, Lacrosse, Track, and Intramurals

There is also a wellness program.

Arts 
Allen-Stevenson offers art, shop, music and theatre programs for grades K-8. These include Art and Shop, Orchestra, Chorus, and Technical Theatre programs. A key part of their theater program, is the annual Gilbert and Sullivan musical performed by members of the sixth through ninth grades. The musical in question is alternated, and potential options include: H.M.S. Pinafore, Iolanthe, and Pirates of Penzance.

Headmasters 
 Francis Bellows Allen (d. November 3, 1952) - 1883-1939, joins with Mr. Stevenson in 1904
 Robert Alston Stevenson - 1904-1947, becomes full-time Headmaster after Mr. Allen leaves in 1939
 Robert "Huck" Alston Stevenson Jr. - 1947-1949, son of Robert A. Stevenson Sr., takes over when his father retires after 43 years.
 From 1949 to 1950, Cesidio Ruel Simboli Ph.D. fills in as acting Headmaster while another one is being selected. He appears as "Acting Headmaster" in the 1950 yearbook.
 Joseph C. Rennard - 1950-1959, introduces navy blazers and gray flannel pants.
 Henry Dyer Tiffany Jr. (b. 1910, d. 1994) - 1959-1974, adds modern science lab and the paneled Bell Library to the school.
 Desmond Francis Patrick Cole (b. 1924, d. 2008) - 1974-1990, expands the science program, introduces micro-computers, and creates the Middle School division.
 David Ross Trower - 1990–2022, appointed by the Board of Trustees.
 Duncan Lyon - 2022-present

Notable alumni
 Dan Abrams - Class of 1981 - Television host, legal commentator
 Jeremy Ben-Ami - Class of 1977 - Executive Director of J Street
 Peter Benchley - Class of 1954 - Author of Jaws, son of humorist and children's book author Nathaniel Benchley, grandson of humorist Robert Benchley
 Bill Block - Class of 1968 - Founder and CEO of QED International, a leading independent motion picture production, financing and sales distributions company
 Gerald Warner Brace (1901–1978) - Writer, educator, sailor, boat-builder
 Jonathan Bush - Class of 1984 - co-founder/Chief Executive Officer of athenahealth, nephew of former U.S. President George H. W. Bush.
 Frank Brunckhorst - Class of 1978 - Chairman, Boar's Head Provision Company
 Michael Douglas - Class of 1959 - Actor and film producer; won Academy Awards for Best Picture for One Flew Over the Cuckoo's Nest (1975) and for Best Actor in Wall Street (1987); received American Film Institute Lifetime Achievement Award in 2009
 Michael Eisner - Class of 1957 - CEO of The Walt Disney Company from 1984 until 2005
 Charles Evans Jr. - Class of 1977 - Film producer and documentary film director; produced Johnny Depp's first directorial effort, The Brave (1997); co-produced Martin Scorsese's Howard Hughes biopic The Aviator (2004)
 Andy Heyward - Class of 1964 - Chairman and CEO of DIC Entertainment, was the co-creator of Inspector Gadget as a writer for Hanna-Barbera in the early 1970s
 Jeffrey Hollender - Class of 1970 - Co-founder and CEO of Seventh Generation Inc
 Charles Horman - Class of 1957 - Journalist, victim of the Chilean coup of 1973
 Honorable Pierre N. Leval - Class of 1951 - US Court of Appeals, Second Circuit
 James MacArthur - Class of 1952 - Actor, best known for the role of Danno Williams in Hawaii Five-O
 John Negroponte - Class of 1953 - Diplomat, lecturer in international affairs at Yale University's MacMillan Center, former U.S. Deputy Secretary of State and first-ever Director of National Intelligence
 Richard C. Perry - Class of 1969 - Hedge fund investor and current owner of Barneys New York
 Philip Proctor - Class of 1955 - Actor and member of The Firesign Theater
 Richard Thomas - Class of 1966 - Actor, best known for playing John-Boy in The Waltons
 Max Brockman - Class of 2003 - Writer for the television series "Girls"
 Simon “Alex” Cohen - Class of 2015 - Music Producer and General Manager of Galactic Records
 Luis Ubinas - Class of 1978 - Former director of the Ford Foundation
 Roberto Mangabeira Unger - Class of 1961 - Philosopher and politician
 Christopher Weaver - Class of 1966 - Founder of Bethesda Softworks
 Chris Weitz - Class of 1984 - Film producer, writer, director and actor; co-directed American Pie and About a Boy with brother Paul (below); they are sons of actress Susan Kohner
 Paul Weitz - Class of 1980 - Film producer, writer, director; screenwriter for Antz
 Norval White - Class of 1940 - Architect, architectural historian, best known for authoring the AIA Guide to New York City
 David Yazbek - Class of 1975 - Emmy-winning writer, musician, composer, and lyricist; wrote the songs for the Broadway musicals The Full Monty (2000), Dirty Rotten Scoundrels (2005), and The Band's Visit (2018)

Notable faculty
 Stanley D. Gauger (b. 1925, d. 2012), director of the Music Department and the Allen-Stevenson School Orchestra, 1948-1986; graduate of the Eastman School of Music in Rochester, New York.
 William Curtis Holdsworth, art teacher, illustrator of children's books The Gingerbread Boy (1968), The Little Red Hen (1969), and Bugaboo Bill (1971).
 Donald Judd (b. 1928, d. 1994), Minimalist artist, taught art at Allen-Stevenson from 1957 to 1961.
 Paul Kellogg, French teacher, Assistant Headmaster and Head of the Lower School, 1967-1975; General and Artistic Director of the New York City Opera, 1996-2006.
 Robelyn Schrade-James (b. 1954, d. 2014), music teacher, pianist, performed at the 1964 New York World's Fair representing Steinway & Sons at age 10, also performed at Lincoln Center and Carnegie Hall.
 Rolande Schrade (b. 1927, d. 2015), music teacher, 1958-1989, pianist and ASCAP composer of more than 100 songs.

Allen-Stevenson in the News
 Allen-Stevenson Gymnastics - 1911
 Allen-Stevenson Boxing Matches - 1912
 Mr. Cole refuses to close Allen-Stevenson during the Blizzard of 1978
 Eighty members of the Allen-Stevenson School Orchestra, including then-Vice President George H. W. Bush's nephew Jonathan Bush Jr., perform at the White House on an unexpectedly rainy day in 1984, to kick off the White House Visitors Concert Series.
 A story in The New Yorker about Allen-Stevenson and dances.
 A legal battle being waged that could have a major impact on how community facilities - schools, churches and doctors' offices - are built in New York City's residential neighborhoods - 1987
 Parents Protesting the End of Standardized Testing at Private Schools
 An article about private school tuition

Affiliated organizations
  New York State Association of Independent Schools
  International Boys' School Coalition

References

Educational institutions established in 1883
Private elementary schools in Manhattan
Private middle schools in Manhattan
Private K–8 schools in Manhattan
Upper East Side
1883 establishments in New York (state)